Fire Chief is a 1940 Disney cartoon starring Donald Duck and his nephews Huey, Dewey, and Louie.

Plot
The cartoon shows Donald living as a firefighter along with his nephews. When the nephews get tired of Donald's snoring, they sound the fire alarm to wake him up, but Donald instead thinks that there is a fire so he rushes to get on the fire truck. He then comes back up to blow the horn to wake them up. Donald and his nephews march like soldiers, but Donald falls backwards, causing Huey to hit the other nephews, and they fall on Donald, which sounds like the NBC Chimes.

Later, Huey puts on coal in the fire truck but Donald puts the entire bucket of coal in the firetruck, causing the house to catch fire. They then try to put out the fire but Donald instead unknowingly puts the hose on the car's gasoline tank. One of the nephews notices and tries to warn him, but Donald pays no heed. As a result, he causes the fire house and the fire truck to burn down completely and, to add insult to injury, Donald's hat burns down as well, resulting in its burnt frames becoming Donald's 'hair'. Defeated, Donald looks at the camera and says to the audience "You can't win. You just can't win."

Voice cast
 Clarence Nash as Donald Duck and Huey, Dewey, and Louie

Reception
The Film Daily called the short "fairly funny".

Home media
The short was released on May 18, 2004, on Walt Disney Treasures: The Chronological Donald, Volume One: 1934-1941.

References

External links
 
 

1940s Disney animated short films
Donald Duck short films
Films about firefighting
1940 animated films
1940 short films
1940 films
Films with screenplays by Carl Barks
Films directed by Jack King
Films produced by Walt Disney
1940s English-language films